The National Gallery (Macedonian: Национална галерија) is a national art museum of North Macedonia in the Old Bazaar, located in the capital city of Skopje. Its permanent collection is housed in the 15th century Turkish Bath building known as the Daut Pasha Baths, but the museum also features a smaller exhibition at the nearby Čifte Hammam. Founded in 1948, the museum's collection dates from the 14th century.

External links
 Official Website

Macedonian art
Buildings and structures in Skopje
Museums in North Macedonia
Ottoman baths